Areva subfulgens is a moth of the subfamily Arctiinae. It was described by Schaus in 1896. It is found in São Paulo, Brazil.

References

Moths described in 1896
Lithosiini
Moths of South America